The Office of Chief Medical Examiner of the City of New York (OCME) is a department within the city government that investigates cases of persons who die within New York City from criminal violence; by casualty or by suicide; suddenly, when in apparent good health; when unattended by a physician; in a correctional facility; or in any suspicious or unusual manner. The OCME also investigates when an application is made pursuant to law for a permit to cremate the body of a deceased person.

History

The office was established on January 1, 1918, pursuant to a 1915 act of the New York State Legislature that abolished the office of the Coroner of New York City. The Chief Medical Examiner is appointed by the mayor. Dr. Patrick D. Riordan was the last coroner and the first acting medical examiner from January 1 to February 1, 1918, when Dr. Charles Norris was appointed by the mayor as the first official Chief Medical Examiner of New York City.

The OCME provides the citizens of New York City essential services directly by identifying the manner and cause of death in specified cases, as well as providing state-of-the-art forensic DNA analysis through the OCME Forensic Biology Laboratory.

These services include on-site investigation into manner and cause of death; identification of remains; performing autopsies; performing DNA testing related to identification of remains; examination of homicide, sexual assault, and other crime evidence collected by the Police Department for DNA extraction and typing; and responding to disasters that involve fatalities as part of a multidisciplinary team of city agencies.

It was reported that as of May 7, 2021, there were 750 bodies "who died during the pandemic" were still inside refrigerated truck trailers at Brooklyn's 39th Street pier awaiting burial.

List of Chief Medical Examiners

Unified Victim Identification System 
In the aftermath of the numerous deaths resulting from the September 11th attacks on New York City and the crash of American Airlines Flight 587, the OCME developed the Unified Victim Identification System (UVIS).  An Internet-enabled database system, it is intended to handle critical fatality management functions in the case of a major disaster with numerous deaths.  It also has functionality to enable the OCME to respond to an influenza pandemic.

See also 
 Coroner of New York City
 Unified Victim Identification System
 Valentino Mazzia
 Working Stiff: Two Years, 262 Bodies, and the Making of a Medical Examiner

References

External links 
 NYC Office of Chief Medical Examiner
 U.S. Department of Health and Human Services Pandemic Influenza Plan

Medical Examiners Office
Forensics organizations
Government agencies established in 1918
Medical examiners